Elizabeth Louise Kendall (born 11 June 1971) is a British Labour Party politician who has been Member of Parliament (MP) for Leicester West since 2010.

Kendall was educated at Queens' College, Cambridge, where she read history. From 2011 to 2015, she served as Shadow Minister for Care and Older People and was invited to attend meetings of the Shadow Cabinet. Kendall stood in the Labour Party leadership election in September 2015 following the resignation of Ed Miliband. She finished in last place. In April 2020, new Labour Leader Keir Starmer appointed Kendall Junior Shadow Minister for Social Care, outside the Shadow Cabinet.

Early life and career 
She attended Watford Grammar School for Girls, where she was a contemporary of Geri Halliwell and the Conservative Member of Parliament (MP) Priti Patel. After leaving school, she attended Cambridge University, graduating with first class honours.

Kendall joined the Labour Party in 1992 and, after leaving university, worked for the Institute for Public Policy Research (IPPR) in the area of child development and early years learning. In 1996, she became a political adviser to Harriet Harman, and her special adviser in the Department for Social Security after the 1997 general election.

In 1998, when Harman was sacked from the government, Kendall resigned and was awarded a fellowship by the King's Fund, a health charity. She also wrote a series of research papers for the IPPR and was appointed as the Director of the Maternity Alliance, a charity for pregnant women. She was unsuccessful in an attempt to be selected as Labour's prospective parliamentary candidate for Chesterfield at the 2001 general election, following the retirement of Tony Benn.

In 2001, she returned to government to work for Patricia Hewitt, at the Department for Trade and Industry, and then followed her to the Department for Health where she was involved in bringing in the smoking ban in 2006. After Hewitt left government, Kendall became the Director of the Ambulance Services Network, where she remained until 2010.

Parliamentary career 
In 2010 Kendall was elected as MP for Leicester West with a majority of 4,017 despite a 7.6% swing away from Labour.
She made her maiden speech in a debate on tackling poverty in the UK on 10 June 2010. She was briefly a member of the Education Select Committee between July 2010 and October 2010. She supported David Miliband for the leadership of the Labour Party in 2010.

In Ed Miliband's first reshuffle in October 2010, she joined the Opposition frontbench as Shadow Junior Health Minister where she served under John Healey. In 2011, she contributed along with other Labour MPs and former Labour ministers to The Purple Book, in which she wrote a chapter on the early years and health and social care where she proposed a "Teach Early Years First" scheme. Later that year, she was appointed to the new role of Shadow Minister for Care and Older People and became an attending member of the shadow cabinet. She was re-elected in the 2015 general election, and was reported as being a member of the Breakfast Club; along with Chuka Umunna, Tristram Hunt and Emma Reynolds.

Labour Party leadership candidature 

On 10 May 2015, Kendall announced that she was standing as a successor to Ed Miliband for the Labour Party's leadership following its defeat in the general election a few days earlier. Kendall was regarded by many in the media as the Blairite candidate, though Kendall stated she would like to be known as the "modernising candidate". In mid-June, Kendall secured the 35 nominations needed for a place in the leadership ballot.

Her leadership bid was supported by Shadow Cabinet colleagues Ivan Lewis, Chuka Umunna, Tristram Hunt, Emma Reynolds and Gloria De Piero. Senior Labour politicians supporting her included Alan Milburn, Alistair Darling, John Hutton and John Reid.

On 19 May 2015, Chesterfield MP Toby Perkins was appointed as her leadership election campaign manager. Her campaign director was Morgan McSweeney, head of the LGA Labour Group. Her director of strategic communications was Mark Ferguson, former editor of LabourList. Other members of her campaign team included Hopi Sen, Margaret McDonagh and Tony Blair's former press spokesman Matthew Doyle. She also had the support of the Blue Labour Group within the Labour Party including figures such as Maurice Glasman and Rowenna Davis.

In June 2015, Kendall's leadership bid received praise from The Sun, who said that she is the "only prayer they [the Labour Party] have". The Sun also praised her for saying "the country comes first" in response to Andy Burnham who said "the Labour Party always comes first" in the Newsnight Labour leadership hustings. Commentators from across the political spectrum said that Kendall was the leadership candidate the Conservatives would "fear the most". This claim was even re-stated by some Conservative politicians including George Osborne, Boris Johnson, Ruth Davidson, Anna Soubry and Philip Davies.

Kendall finished 4th in the election, obtaining 4.5% (18,857) of the vote.

Resignation from the Shadow Cabinet 
Kendall resigned from the Shadow Cabinet following the election of Jeremy Corbyn as Labour leader in September 2015. She supported Owen Smith in the failed attempt to replace Jeremy Corbyn in the 2016 Labour Party leadership election. One year later James Chapman, former Director of Communications at HM Treasury under George Osborne, said, "We really need Liz Kendall to be the leader of [a] new centre party." Chapman had already tweeted his proposals for a new centrist political party opposed to Brexit, 'The Democrats'. After stepping down from frontline politics, Kendall was a regular guest on BBC current affairs programme This Week until its cancellation in July 2019.

Return to frontbench 
Keir Starmer reappointed her to the frontbench after winning the 2020 Labour leadership election. After the November 2021 shadow cabinet reshuffle, it was announced that Karin Smyth will cover her duties while Kendall is on maternity leave.

Positions

Economic and fiscal policy 
Kendall has argued that Labour should be "genuinely as passionate about wealth creation as we are about wealth redistribution" and her party should not just understand business but be "the champion of people who take a risk, create something and make a success of it". Kendall has also said that there is "nothing progressive about racking up debts for the next generation" and it is wrong to spend more on debt interest repayments than on education. Kendall has given support to George Osborne's plan to enshrine in law an overall budget surplus during "normal times" but has called for more detail on the proposals. Kendall has also said that the last Labour government was wrong to run a deficit before the financial crash but that it did not cause the crash.

Kendall has also committed herself to the living wage and said the Low Pay Commission's remit should be extended to encourage more firms to pay it and has said she would end the exploitation of care workers by preventing firms from docking the cost of uniform and travel time from their wages. She has also come out in support of worker representation on company boards as part of her plans for economic reform. After the Budget, Kendall commissioned her supporter, the former minister Margaret Hodge, to undertake a review into the £100bn tax reliefs that firms are entitled to.

Defence and foreign policy 
Kendall is a pro-European and has spoken in favour of reforming the European Union. She supported an in/out referendum on Britain's membership of the EU, and wanted the Labour Party to play a leading role in a cross-party Yes to Europe campaign. Kendall also backed the NATO target to spend at least 2% of GDP on defence. She is in favour of renewing Britain's Trident nuclear submarines. Kendall supports a two-state solution, but she abstained on a motion recognising the State of Palestine, instead favouring the continuation of the Israeli–Palestinian peace process. She is a member of Labour Friends of Israel.

Education 
Kendall has spoken about education as a way of tackling inequality. She has spoken in support of expanding the academies programme and keeping the free schools initiative saying that focus should be on the quality of education rather than structures and that investment in the early years should be a priority over cutting university tuition fees. Kendall also said that more effort was needed in the education system to raise aspiration for the 'white working class young'. Kendall has also said that as Prime Minister, she would order a review of National Lottery Funding to free up funds for early years services.

Health and welfare

Kendall has advocated increased patient choice in the NHS, arguing "there will remain a role for the private and voluntary sectors where they can add extra capacity to the NHS or challenges to the system" and with healthcare providers "what matters is what works".

In 2015, Kendall supported the £23,000 benefit cap.

Immigration 
Kendall gave some support to David Cameron's proposal that the right of EU migrants to claim tax credits and benefits should be withdrawn, or delayed for a number of years. She supports the current points-based immigration system and backed tough rules on abuse of the immigration system but has pledged not to try and "out-UKIP UKIP" and spoke of the benefits of immigration in her own constituency.

Devolution 
Kendall has supported "radical devolution" to England to deal with the West Lothian Question and appointed Tristram Hunt to look at what powers ought to be devolved to England. In July 2015, Kendall came out in favour of English Votes for English Laws. Her leadership rivals favoured the formation of a constitutional convention to consider the issue. Kendall has also said that Labour must oppose the 'tyranny of the bureaucratic state' but must also share power at every level so that powers are devolved to communities and individuals too.

Trade unions 
Kendall has supported Labour's links with the trade union movement but has said that both the trade unions and the Labour Party have to change. Kendall said that if she became Prime Minister, she would reverse any changes to trade union and employment rights made by the previous Conservative government. Kendall also criticised Len McCluskey for threatening to withdraw funding from the Labour Party were his choice of candidate not to be elected.

Social issues 
Kendall is a supporter of LGBT rights and voted for gay marriage in 2013. Kendall has said that, under her leadership, the Labour Party would work with other centre-left parties to end the criminalisation of homosexuality across the world and she has spoken in favour of Michael Cashman becoming the UK's special envoy on LGBTI issues.

Personal life 
Kendall was previously in a relationship with the actor and comedian Greg Davies. They ended their relationship a few months before the 2015 general election. 
In November 2021 Kendall announced she would take maternity leave in 2022 as she would be having a baby through surrogacy. She and her partner welcomed their son Henry in January 2022.

Notes

References

External links 

 
 BBC Radio 4 Profile
 
 

|-

1971 births
Living people
21st-century British women politicians
21st-century English people
21st-century English women
Alumni of Queens' College, Cambridge
British special advisers
Female members of the Parliament of the United Kingdom for English constituencies
Labour Friends of Israel
Labour Party (UK) MPs for English constituencies
People educated at Watford Grammar School for Girls
People from Abbots Langley
UK MPs 2010–2015
UK MPs 2015–2017
UK MPs 2017–2019
UK MPs 2019–present